Tamariz is a surname. Notable people with the surname include:

Carlos Cueva Tamariz (1898–1991), Ecuadorian politician, lawyer and university professor
Ernesto Tamariz (1904–1988), Mexican sculptor 
Hugo Salazar Tamariz (1923–1999), Ecuadorian poet, novelist and playwright
Juan Tamariz (born 1942), Spanish magician